The Cappies (Critics and Awards Program) is an international program for recognizing, celebrating, and providing learning experiences for high school theater and journalism students and teenage playwrights.

There are currently 13 Cappies programs in the U.S. and Canada, which range in size from five to 55 participating high schools. Within each program, every participating high school selects three to nine students for a critic team. After receiving training in theater criticism and review writing, they attend plays and musicals at other high schools in their area. They write reviews (of roughly 400 words) on deadline. Volunteer teacher-mentors lead discussions and select the critic-written reviews that are later published by area newspapers, with student bylines.

The programs operate in and around Baltimore, Maryland; Cincinnati, Ohio; Dallas, Texas; El Paso, Texas; Ft. Lauderdale – Palm Beach, Florida; Houston, Texas; Kansas City, Missouri; Melbourne, Florida; Northern New Jersey; Orange County, California; Orlando, Florida; Philadelphia, PA; St. Louis, Missouri; Salt Lake City, Utah; Springfield, Missouri; Washington, DC; Edmonton, Alberta; and Ottawa, Ontario.

History

The Cappies began in 1999, in response to the Columbine tragedy, as an effort to bring more positive attention to teenagers engaged in creative pursuits. Capitol Steps founder Bill Strauss approached Fairfax County, Virginia public school administrator Judy Bowns, and together they developed the plan for the program. The program began in Fairfax and immediately became popular among high school drama departments in the area, growing from 14 schools in the fall of 1999 to 23 schools by that spring. The Cappies quickly spread to encompass the entire metro Washington, D.C., area. The Washington Post and several other local papers published student-written reviews, often with photographs (They have since ceased this activity, but instead now post these reviews online in a section entitled "Tomorrow's Critics".). As a result, the Cappies became a showcase for local theater and journalism talent, with over 50 schools around Washington, the largest Cappies region. Since 2002, it has operated nationwide, with new regional groups appearing yearly.

Organization and process 
To start a Cappies program, one must organize a small local meeting with students, parents, and teachers. Four schools must participate for the application to be approved. A steering committee (including a Program director, chair, treasurer, and two other members) is formed, and a charter application must be applied for. While waiting for approval, one should find local newspapers/media outlets that are willing to publish 1-2 reviews on a weekly basis. Once approved, a $300 annual application fee must be paid to Cappies, plus a $5–10 per-critic fee that is assessed in November based on critic training sessions and enrollments in the online information services. Each regional steering committee determines the per-school fee requirements.

Each regional program has a steering committee, with a charter from The Cappies. These are volunteers who oversee the work done by critics and teacher-mentors (who are also volunteers), and who then produce the Cappies Gala.

Participating schools select one show (a play or a musical) as their Cappies show. Some smaller Cappies programs allow schools to select two shows. The schools also select teachers to be mentors, who supervise the student critics and help maintain the integrity of the review-writing process. Before the season begins, the mentors and critics receive training from Cappies officials and are often aided by local journalists.

On the night of a Cappies show, the critics arrive early, attend the performance, and hold private discussions beforehand, during intermission, and after the show. Afterward, they do a preliminary awards evaluation, selecting who will be on the Cappie awards ballot at the end of the year. After returning home, each critic writes a 200- to 600-word review. The mentors select the reviews they consider the most honest, objective, and best-written, which are then forwarded to local newspapers, many of whom publish these reviews with student bylines.

Critics are encouraged to write real reviews, differentiating between shows that are outstanding and those that fall short in various ways. Cappies reviews can and usually do include criticisms, but these should be objective and fair. Also, individuals responsible for a problem should not be named. For example, if a vocalist sings off-key, a critic may state that as an issue in the show, but may not identify the vocalist. With these rules, the Cappies program reflects a consensus among theater teachers that at the high school level, criticisms are appropriate if they are constructive, but not if they are harsh, sarcastic, or personal.

After awards voting, each program then holds a Cappies Gala to present Cappie awards and to celebrate the year's shows. Sometimes these galas are held at schools, and other times at major theater venues. The Cappies of the National Capital Area holds its gala in the Concert Hall of the Kennedy Center, the center's largest performance space. These galas are formal and generally include local VIP award presenters, along with performances of songs or scenes from nominated shows. They usually run from two-and-a-half to three hours, and some are televised.

Cappie Awards 

 Critic (based on gender or year in school)
 Critic Team
 Marketing and Publicity
 Sound
 Make-Up
 Props
 Special Effects and/or Technology
 Lighting
 Sets
 Costumes
 Stage Crew
 Stage Management*
 Orchestra
 Choreography
 Creativity
 Ensemble in a Play
 Ensemble in a Musical
 Featured Actor
 Featured Actress
 Female Dancer
 Male Dancer
 Female Vocalist
 Male Vocalist
 Comic Actress in a Play
 Comic Actor in a Play
 Comic Actress in a Musical
 Comic Actor in a Musical
 Supporting Actress in a Play
 Supporting Actor in a Play
 Supporting Actress in a Musical
 Supporting Actor in a Musical
 Lead Actress in a Play
 Lead Actor in a Play
 Lead Actress in a Musical
 Lead Actor in a Musical
 Song
 Play
 Musical

* The Stage Management category is only featured in the Orange County, California chapter of Cappies.

Awards rules 
At the end of the school year, within each program, critics who review the required minimum number of shows (usually five) become judges for Cappie nominations and awards. Except for critic awards (determined by a digital formula), all Cappie nominations and awards are decided by student critics.

The student critics gather at a central computer site to vote. This process is carefully supervised by adult proctors, and reviewed for accuracy by a trustee and auditor. Depending on the program, there can be anywhere from three to five nominees per award category. The nominees are announced shortly after the voting.

The outcome of all awards is determined by unique software developed in 2002 by two high school students from Thomas Jefferson High School for Science and Technology in Alexandria, Virginia.

Awards are only given to high school students in grades 9–12. The amount of adult involvement in offstage work (building sets, sewing costumes, playing in orchestras, etc.) is strictly established in the rules. A Cappies show that has adults exceeding the allowed level of involvement is not eligible for that category, but is eligible for all other awards.

A steering committee of a regional Cappies program can, if it chooses, give a Special Award for Service to a high school student who gave exceptional help, either to the Cappies or to high school theater throughout his or her region.

Cappies International Theater 
Every summer, winners of Lead Actor and Actress awards from all programs are invited to attend the Cappies International Theater. This CIT company presents three shows, all written entirely by high school students: Starz! (monologues, songs, and minimusicals), Playz! (short plays), and a full-length student-written musical. The latter two are performed at the Kennedy Center Theater Lab.

The Cappies International Theater is a summer program focused on the development of dramatic and musical skills. They produce several shows in different categories, and often perform the work of their peers. Students interested in the technical elements of theater also have opportunities to practice and demonstrate their skills.

Cappies International Theater began in the summer of 2002 at a small theater in Hollywood. In 2003, in partnership with the Kennedy Center, it moved to Washington, D.C., under the name Cappies National Theater. When the first Canadian program (in Ottawa) joined the Cappies in 2005, the name was changed to Cappies International Theater. Starting in 2006, CIT began featuring works by high school student playwrights, including the two full-length musicals Edit:Undo and Senioritis. Both were written by nine-person creative teams of student book writers, lyricists, composers, and a digital artist.

Student-written musicals 
In 2006, CIT presented the student-written musical Edit:Undo, which is about teenage life and relationships in the digital era. A CD and DVD of Edit:Undo are available for sale on the website.

In 2007, the CIT company presented the student-written musical Senioritis, which is about the anxieties of senior year. A CD and feature-length film was to be made of Senioritis, following the Kennedy Center performances.

In 2008, the Cappies entered into a licensing agreement with the school's musical publisher Next Gen Publications, to represent Edit:Undo, Senioritis, Free-the-Music.com and founder Strauss' Makiddo worldwide.

The Cappies International Theater has not taken place since 2009, but may resume in the future.

See also
Canada's Capital Cappies (Ottawa, Canada)
National Pacemaker Awards (high school and college)
 Senioritis

References 

 Adam Campbell and Victoria Hays, "How the Cappies Got Started: An Interview with a Co-Founder" . Accessed at 07:40 UTC, January 31, 2006. 
 The New York Times, "Theater Students Get Their Share of the Limelight", The New York Times, June 23, 2002. Late Edition - Final. Section 1. 
 Meredith Billman-Mani, "Adversity Begets Cappies — and More." The Connection Newspaper, April 15, 2004.

External links
 Cappies
 Cappies International Theater

Awards honoring children or youth
Student awards
Dramatist and playwright awards
Literary awards honouring young writers
American journalism awards
Canadian journalism awards
American theater awards